Susan Reynolds FBA (27 January 1929 – 29 July 2021) was a British medieval historian whose book Fiefs and Vassals: the Medieval Evidence Reinterpreted (1994) was part of the academic critique on the concept of feudalism as classically portrayed by previous historians such as François-Louis Ganshof and Marc Bloch.  Reynolds rejected typical ideas of feudalism and presented a medieval society structured through ‘horizontal’ groups. According to The Guardian, "Few books have been more intensely discussed by professional medieval historians. Largely as a consequence of this work, the word "feudalism", or the "F-word", as it came to be called by historians, began to lose currency among British medievalists." Reynolds did not only write books that have changed the way we think about the past, but was someone who was constantly examining her own ideas and whose interests were extraordinarily wide-ranging.

Life
Reynolds was born in London, the daughter of a solicitor, and after Howell’s School, Denbigh took a first degree at Lady Margaret Hall ("LMH"), at the University of Oxford.  Her first job was as an archivist at the Middlesex County Record Office. A year later she joined the Victoria County History as an editor, remaining there for seven years and taking a diploma in archival administration. In an interview for the Institute of Historical Research, Reynolds pointed out that the archival diploma was her only higher qualification; she never gained either an MA or a PhD in history, but had only a bachelor's degree.

She taught at girl's schools from before 1960 to 1964, when she was unexpectedly offered a fellowship over lunch at her old college, Lady Margaret Hall.  After she took early retirement from LMH in 1986, the Institute of Historical Research, British Library and other libraries became the place where she worked regularly. After a year teaching at Dartmouth College in New Hampshire, lived in London, with summers mostly spent in France.  She continued to research and was involved with the Institute of Historical Research.

Reynolds believed that the technical terms used in documents prior to around 1100 did not necessarily hold the meanings ascribed to them by historians who had preceded her; and that clerks of later periods tended to read into earlier documents meanings and relationships current in their own day. In her view, direct ownership of land was more prevalent in the early Middle Ages than had been thought, and the decline of central authority had been exaggerated.

She was elected to the British Academy in 1993.  She was an Emeritus Fellow of LMH.

Books

 Introduction to the History of English Medieval Towns, 1977.
 Kingdoms and Communities in Western Europe 900-1300, Oxford, 1984.
 Fiefs and Vassals. The Medieval Evidence Reinterpreted, 1994.
 Ideas and Solidarities of the Medieval Laity : England and Western Europe, 1995.
 Before Eminent Domain: Toward a History of Expropriation of Land for the Common Good, 2014.

Notes

External links
 University of London School of Advanced Studies Faculty page for Susan Reynolds
Pauline Stafford on the social media response to Susan Reynolds’ death
 

1929 births
2021 deaths
British historians
British medievalists
Women medievalists
British women historians
Contributors to the Victoria County History
Corresponding Fellows of the Medieval Academy of America
Alumni of Lady Margaret Hall, Oxford
Fellows of Lady Margaret Hall, Oxford
Fellows of the British Academy
Feudalism in Europe